Loen is a village in Stryn Municipality in Vestland county, Norway. It is located in the inner part of the Nordfjord region, at the easternmost end of the Nordfjorden. The lake Lovatnet is located just to the southeast of the village of Loen. The Hotel Alexandra was established in Loen in 1884. The historic Loen Church is also located in the village.

History
Loen is the home to some of the oldest farms in Norway: Sæten (Setin), Tjugen (Tyfin), and Loen. They were probably established long before the time of Christianity. Much of the upper Loen valley was devastated from two rockfall slides (one in 1905 and one in 1936) that created huge waves that swept with them most of the houses and vegetation. A total of 135 people were killed in these two incidents.

Attractions
Some nearby attractions include the Jostedalsbreen nasjonalparksenter museum, Jostedalsbreen National Park, the mountain Skåla, the Tindefjellbreen glacier, and the Ramnefjellsfossen waterfall.

The Loen Skylift is located in Loen.

Media gallery

References

Villages in Vestland
Stryn